Sankara, Burkina Faso is a village in the Tiéfora Department of Comoé Province in south-western Burkina Faso. The village has a population of 891. This village would be named in memory of Thomas Sankara, Military, revolutionary and President of Burkina Faso.

References

Populated places in the Cascades Region
Comoé Province